Yuzhi Lu station is a station on Line 8 of the Beijing Subway.

Station Layout 
The station has 2 underground side platforms.

Exits 
There are 4 exits, lettered A, B, and D. Exit A is accessible.

References

Beijing Subway stations in Changping District
Railway stations in China opened in 2013